The United Peasant Party (abbr. УСС or USS) is a political party in Serbia. Its primary area of strength is in the municipality of Svrljig.

History 
According to the party's website, the United Peasant Party was established in Belgrade in 2000 via a merger of three small peasant parties. At the party's founding meeting, Dragoslav Avramović agreed to be its honorary president; he died the following year. The USS won representation in the Svrljig municipal assembly in the 2000 local elections, and local party leader Milija Miletić became mayor of the municipality in 2008.

The USS was not formally registered as a political party until 2010; prior to this time, it was designated as a Citizens' Group. Miletić was recognized as the party's leader at the time of tis registration and continues to hold this position as of 2021. He is the only member of the USS to have served in the national assembly, having been first elected in the 2014 Serbian parliamentary election on the electoral list of the Serbian Progressive Party and then re-elected on the same party's lists in the 2016 and 2020.

Electoral performance

Parliamentary elections

References 

2000 establishments in Serbia
Agrarian parties in Serbia
Political parties established in 2000